Petr Kotik (surname originally Kotík) (born January 27, 1942, in Prague) is a composer, conductor and flutist living in New York City. He was educated in Europe (Prague Conservatory, graduated 1961; Vienna Music Academy, graduated 1966; AMU Prague, graduated 1969). From 1960 to 1963, Kotik studied composition privately with Jan Rychlík in Prague, and from 1963 to 1966 at the Music Academy in Vienna with Karl Schieske, Hans Jelinek, and Friedrich Cerha. In Prague, he founded and directed Musica Viva Pragensis (1961–64) and the QUAX Ensemble (1966–69). He came to the United States in 1969 at the invitation of Lukas Foss and Lejaren Hiller to join the Center for Creative and Performing Arts at the University at Buffalo.

Since 1983, Kotik has been living in New York City. Kotik is the founder and Artistic Director of the S.E.M. Ensemble, based in New York City, which presents both chamber and orchestra concerts. Kotik has received numerous commissions and composition grants, from the National Endowment for the Arts. Kotik received a 1996 Foundation for Contemporary Arts Grants to Artists Award. He is also known for his realization of the complete musical works of Marcel Duchamp.

With the S.E.M. Ensemble (which he founded in 1970), Kotik has for many years actively promoted the work of other (mostly American) composers sharing a stylistic affinity with his own work, giving frequent performances as conductor and performer with the group as well as its larger version, the Orchestra of the S.E.M. Ensemble.

Kotik's music is composed in the minimal vein, with works often being of long duration and featuring slow tempi and quiet dynamics. Though his works feature innumerable gradual, slight changes, giving them a seemingly static quality, his harmonies, however, are more complex than those employed by many other American minimal composers, and his musical process is not as apparent to the listener as, for example, in the works of Steve Reich or Philip Glass. Further, Kotik does not draw as heavily on jazz or rock in his works as do many of his American colleagues (though, like Steve Reich, he is quite interested in Medieval music and often integrates Medieval compositional techniques into his works). These qualities set Kotik's music apart from American minimal trends, giving his music a decidedly European character more similar in outlook to, for example, that of Hungarian minimalists such as Zoltán Jeney, László Sáry, or László Vidovszky.

Among Kotik's best known works is the six-hour opera Many Many Women (1976–78), based on a text by Gertrude Stein, for whose work, appropriately, Kotik has a special affinity.

As a performer, Kotik has been an active chamber musician throughout much of his life. Until 1992, Kotik did not have the slightest interest in orchestra. That changed in 1992, when he conducted Atlas Eclipticalis by John Cage with the 86-piece Orchestra of the S.E.M. Ensemble in Tribute to John Cage at Carnegie Hall, with David Tudor as the soloist. Since then, Kotik has been organizing large-scale events, expanding the S.E.M. Ensemble into The Orchestra of the S.E.M. Ensemble, and encouraging and commissioning other composers to write for orchestra. In 1999, after conducting Gruppen by Karlheinz Stockhausen, Kotik initiated a project of compositions for 3 orchestras and commissioned the creation of new 3-orchestra works by Alvin Lucier, Christian Wolff, Martin Smolka, Phill Niblock and Olga Neuwirth. In 2001, Kotik founded the biennial Ostrava Days, an Institute and Festival of New Music in Ostrava, Czech Republic. This three-week program, one of the largest in existence, focuses on works for orchestra, with two resident orchestras and number of resident composers, chamber music groups and soloists.

Although Kotik entered the conservatory at the age of 14, he only began composing in his late teens. This was due to his lack of interest in classical harmony, a tendency shared with other composers such as Christian Wolff and John Cage. As a composer, Kotik is essentially self-taught, in spite of his education in Western composition fundamentals in Prague and Vienna. His technique has very little to do with commonly used compositional methods.

Kotik's compositional system can be compared to a game in which the use of controlled chance is balanced by conscious decision-making. The two alternate, one influencing the other. In this way  Kotik triggers unpredictable processes while the work progresses in the envisioned direction. In recent years, Kotik has relied increasingly on intuitive gestures. The strategies and limitations Kotik imposes on chance, along with intuitive decisions, are at the root of his compositional process.
 
Among Kotik's best-known compositions are Music for 3 (1964) for piano and 2 strings; Spontano (1964) for piano and ensemble (composed for Frederic Rzewski); Kontrabandt (1967), a live electronic work commissioned by the WDR Electronic Music Studio; Many Many Women (1975–78) on a text by Gertrude Stein; and Letters to Olga (1988–91) on a text by Václav Havel. His orchestra pieces include: Quiescent Form (1994–96); the one-hour-long Music in Two Movements (1998–2002); Variations for 3 Orchestras (2002–2005); and Spheres and Attraction (2005–2006) for 2 voices, string quartet and percussion on a text by R. Buckminster Fuller.
 
"Kotik’s massive and too modestly named Fragment (1st movement of Music in Two Movements), which he conducted with his SEM Orchestra gives me sufficient pretext to voice the overdue sentiment that he is one of the best composers working today...among those writing abstract works for ensembles of unconventional instruments, Kotik stands very near the top and possibly at the top. He produced some of the most durable, though still little-known musical monuments of the post-Cage 70s, and his output has been amazingly consistent in quality.” (New York music critic and composer Kyle Gann, The Village Voice 1998).

Kotik's music is available on the Labor, Dog w/a Bone and Ear-Rational labels.

His father was the painter Jan Kotík. He is married to the curator and art historian Charlotta Kotik, great-granddaughter of Tomáš Garrigue Masaryk, and has a son, Tomas (Tom), who is a New York-based sculptor. His other son, Jan Jakub Kotik, was born in 1972 and died of cancer in 2007.

Sources

External links
 Petr Kotik page at Czech Music Information Centre website
 S.E.M. Ensemble official site

1942 births
20th-century classical composers
21st-century classical composers
Contemporary classical music performers
Czech classical composers
Czech male classical composers
Living people
Prague Conservatory alumni
University at Buffalo alumni
University of Music and Performing Arts Vienna alumni
Musicians from Prague
20th-century Czech male musicians
21st-century Czech male musicians